The Pinn is a suburban, outer west London river. It has dendritic headwaters, the furthest is considered its sourcein Harrow Weald. Its confluence with Frays River makes it a tributary of the Colne. It is one of three principal rivers wholly in the historic county of Middlesex.

Route
The river runs through Pinner, the northern halves of Eastcote and Ruislip: the latter may be a notable rise-lip of land as 17th century maps often have the place name but likely derives from "rush leap" from the local width of the river. It then runs through Ickenham and on to Uxbridge, where it passes through the former grounds of RAF Uxbridge and Brunel University. The Pinn continues on to Pield Heath and Cowley, passing under the Grand Union canal before joining the Frays River, an anabranch of the Colne, at Yiewsley.

During the Second World War only, the Pinn was dammed near Pinner High Street for water for putting out fires from air raids.

The middle and lower thirds of the course are between the Colne and Crane, all flowing south, thus making up parallel drainage.

Celandine Route

This is a  walk through woodland, meadows and parks. It finishes at the Grand Union Canal towpath parallel to the Fray's River anabranch of the Colne.

Connections
A short walk east along the Slough Arm of the Grand Union Canal connects.

The Grand Union Canal towpath connects, linking in Brentford (east south-east), Watford and the Midlands (north), and the Paddington Arm (central London, east).

Water quality
All local sewerage runs to the distant Mogden Sewage Treatment Works discharging its treated waters to the Tideway. This spares the Pinn from the incident nitrogen, bleach (ammonia) and other chemical biohazards which many of its catchment homes and business use and/or discharge.

The Pinn's flow is weak save for after moderate or heavy rain.

See also
List of rivers of England

Citations and footnotes

External links

Celandine Route - along the River Pinn
River Pinn Meadows

Rivers of London
2Pinn
Geography of the London Borough of Hillingdon
Pinner